The 1963 Purdue Boilermakers football team was an American football team that represented Purdue University during the 1963 Big Ten Conference football season.  In their eighth season under head coach Jack Mollenkopf, the Boilermakers compiled a 5–4 record, finished in fourth place in the Big Ten Conference with a 4–3 record against conference opponents, and were outscored by their opponents by a combined total of 149 to 119.

Notable players from the 1963 Purdue football team included quarterback Ron DiGravio and end Bob Hadrick.

Schedule

References

Purdue
Purdue Boilermakers football seasons
Purdue Boilermakers football